Tigre District is one of five districts of the province Loreto in Peru.

Places of interest
 Pucacuro Reserved Zone

References

Districts of the Loreto Province
Districts of the Loreto Region